Hemiasteridae is a family of echinoderms belonging to the order Spatangoida.

Genera

Genera:
 Bolbaster Pomel, 1869
 Cheopsia Fourtau, 1909
 Hemiaster Agassiz, 1847

References

Spatangoida
Echinoderm families